Dixa nubilipennis  is a species of fly in the family Dixidae. It is found in the  Palearctic.

References

Dixidae
Insects described in 1832
Nematoceran flies of Europe